Clonmore is a village in County Carlow, Ireland. It is located 3½ miles south of Hacketstown and 9 miles east of Tullow in the north-east corner of County Carlow.

History

Clonmore was named after St Mogue (not to be confused with another St Mogue of the same name) who, around the year 530,  established a religious community and built a monastery at the location.

The monastery is recorded as having been plundered multiple times by the vikings between 832 and 836 who were likely overwintering in nearby County Wicklow. A specific incident is recorded as having occurred on Christmas eve 835.

It is likely the original 6th century monastic settlement was destroyed in a power struggle around the year 1040 by Diarmait mac Máel na mBó who wished to prevent the monastery being used by the Mac Murchadas as a base from which to challenge his kingship of south Leinster.

Clonmore castle
A significant feature of the village is Clonmore Castle, this castle was not mentioned until the 14th century, but the shape of the trefoil window in the south wall shows that it was built probably towards the end of the 13th century. The castle is nearly square in plan with rectangular towers at the southern sides of the courtyard. Clonmore was captured in 1516 by the Earl of Kildare and in 1598 by the Earl of Ormond. It changed hands several times and was finally taken by Oliver Cromwell's forces under Colonel Hewson in 1650. Today much of the castle has been removed for construction of local amenities such as the neighbouring hall and former schoolhouse

See also
 List of towns in the Republic of Ireland

References

External links

 Clonmore
 Deery Trailers
 Article: The Riches of Clonmore by Eddie McDonald
 (Poem) St. Mogue's Well by Clifton Redmond

Towns and villages in County Carlow